Glipostenoda is a genus of beetles in the family Mordellidae, containing the following species:

 Glipostenoda aka (Kôno, 1928)
 Glipostenoda ambusta (LeConte, 1862)
 Glipostenoda brunnescens Ermisch, 1952
 Glipostenoda castaneicolor Ermisch, 1950
 Glipostenoda chibi (Kôno, 1932)
 Glipostenoda cinnamonea (Ermisch, 1953)
 Glipostenoda decellei Ermisch, 1968
 Glipostenoda desaegeri Ermisch, 1952
 Glipostenoda excellens Horák, 1995
 Glipostenoda excisa Nomura, 1967
 Glipostenoda falsomultistrigosa Franciscolo, 1967
 Glipostenoda ferruginea Horák, 1995
 Glipostenoda freyi Ermisch, 1962
 Glipostenoda fusciceps Nomura, 1967
 Glipostenoda guana Lu & Ivie, 1999
 Glipostenoda hisamatsui Chûjô, 1956
 Glipostenoda imadatei Chûjô, 1964
 Glipostenoda incognita Ermisch, 1962
 Glipostenoda ivoirensis Ermisch, 1968
 Glipostenoda kaihuana Fan & Yang, 1995
 Glipostenoda kawasakii Nomura, 1967
 Glipostenoda kimotoi Chûjô, 1957
 Glipostenoda klapperichi Ermisch, 1952
 Glipostenoda lineatisuturalis Nomura, 1967
 Glipostenoda luteorubra (Ermisch, 1965)
 Glipostenoda matsumurai (Kôno, 1932)
 Glipostenoda matsushitai Tokeji, 1954
 Glipostenoda melanocephala Ermisch, 1952
 Glipostenoda mellissiana (Wollaston, 1870)
 Glipostenoda monostrigosa Franciscolo, 1958
 Glipostenoda multistrigosa Ermisch, 1952
 Glipostenoda neocastanea Batten, 1990
 Glipostenoda nigriceps Ermisch, 1968
 Glipostenoda nigrofusca Ermisch, 1968
 Glipostenoda permira Franciscolo, 1962
 Glipostenoda phengotrichia Nomura, 1951
 Glipostenoda pseudexcisa Nomura, 1975
 Glipostenoda pulla (Fahraeus, 1870)
 Glipostenoda quinquestrigosa Franciscolo, 1958
 Glipostenoda retusa Nomura, 1967
 Glipostenoda rimogana Nomura, 1967
 Glipostenoda rosseola (Marseul, 1876)
 Glipostenoda sasajii Shiyake, 2001
 Glipostenoda shizuokana (Kôno, 1935)
 Glipostenoda signatella (Marseul, 1876)
 Glipostenoda taiwana (Kôno, 1934)
 Glipostenoda takaosana (Kôno, 1932)
 Glipostenoda takashii Nomura, 1967
 Glipostenoda testacea Ermisch, 1968
 Glipostenoda testaceicornis (Píc, 1931)
 Glipostenoda trichophora (Nomura, 1951)

References

Mordellidae